Canal Street is a 2018 American drama thriller film directed by Rhyan LaMarr. The film was distributed by Smith Global Media and opened over Martin Luther King Jr. Day weekend. It was filmed in Chicago. Canal Street was screened at the American Black Film Festival.

Plot
Kholi Styles, a young black teenager, is wrongfully accused of the murder of his white classmate from Winnetka. His father, Jackie Styles, is an up-and-coming lawyer who goes to court to fight for his son's innocence.

Cast

Bryshere Y. Gray as Kholi
Lance Reddick as Jerry Shaw
Michael Beach as Ronald Morgan
Jamie Hector as Pastor Sam Billings
Mykelti Williamson as Jackie Styles
Jon Seda as Detective Mike Watts
Will Yun Lee as Officer Hank Chu
Harry Lennix as DJ Terrance Palmer
Mekhi Phifer as Prosecutor A.J. Canton
FERN as (himself) FERN 
Reed Shannon as Joe
Jacqueline Pinol as China
William R. Moses as Bill Sudermill
Nora Dunn as Marge Sudermill
Tawny Newsome as Kai
Yancey Arias as DJ Wado
LaRoyce Hawkins as Amari Crawford
Kevin Quinn as Brian Sudermill
Lyric Ross as Tameka
DeVon Franklin as The Key Note
Juani Feliz as Zoey Swanson
Woody McClain as MayMay

References

External links
 
 

2018 films
2018 thriller drama films
African-American films
American thriller drama films
Films set in Chicago
Films shot in Chicago
Films about race and ethnicity
Films about racism
2010s English-language films
2010s American films